Homapoderus is a genus of weevils in the family Attelabidae. The genus was named and described by Legalov in 2003.

Species

 Homapoderus angustifrons (Voss, 1926)
 Homapoderus anxius (Faust, 1894)
 Homapoderus arboretum (Kolbe, 1898)
 Homapoderus ashantensis Legalov, 2007
 Homapoderus bicolor Legalov, 2007
 Homapoderus centralafricanus Legalov, 2007
 Homapoderus collarti Legalov, 2007
 Homapoderus congener (Voss, 1929)
 Homapoderus congoanus (Voss, 1937)
 Homapoderus conradti (Faust, 1898)
 Homapoderus convexus Legalov, 2007
 Homapoderus corallinus (Voss, 1926)
 Homapoderus cyaneus (Gyllenhal, 1839)
 Homapoderus deceptor (Voss, 1926)
 Homapoderus denticulatus (Voss, 1926)
 Homapoderus diffinis (Voss, 1933)
 Homapoderus distinguendulus (Voss, 1926)
 Homapoderus dualaicus (Voss, 1926)
 Homapoderus equateurensis Legalov, 2007
 Homapoderus flavobasis (Voss, 1926)
 Homapoderus flavoides Legalov, 2007
 Homapoderus foveolatoides Legalov, 2007
 Homapoderus foveolatus (Voss, 1926)
 Homapoderus fuscicornis (Fabricius, 1792)
 Homapoderus ghanensis Legalov, 2007
 Homapoderus goellneri Legalov, 2007
 Homapoderus haemopterus (Voss, 1926)
 Homapoderus hemixanthocnemis (Voss, 1926)
 Homapoderus isabellinus (Voss, 1926)
 Homapoderus ituriensis (Voss, 1944)
 Homapoderus kamerunensis Legalov, 2007
 Homapoderus lepersonneae (Voss, 1944)
 Homapoderus lubutuensis Legalov, 2007
 Homapoderus melanocnemis (Voss, 1926)
 Homapoderus mirabilis Legalov, 2007
 Homapoderus murzini Legalov, 2007
 Homapoderus neisabellinus Legalov, 2007
 Homapoderus nigritarsis (Voss, 1926)
 Homapoderus nigroscutellaris (Voss, 1926)
 Homapoderus occidentalis Legalov, 2007
 Homapoderus ochrobasis (Voss, 1926)
 Homapoderus pseudotolerans (Voss, 1926)
 Homapoderus pseudovitreus (Voss, 1926)
 Homapoderus robustidorsalis (Voss, 1926)
 Homapoderus semipallens (Faust, 1898)
 Homapoderus tamsi (Voss, 1937)
 Homapoderus tolerans (Faust, 1894)
 Homapoderus ugandensis Legalov, 2007
 Homapoderus vitreus (Faust, 1898)
 Homapoderus zairicus Legalov, 2007

References

Attelabidae